Alexandre Volkoff (Russian Александр Александрович Волков, transliteration Aleksandr Aleksandrovič Volkov, 1885–1942) was a Russian actor, screenwriter, and film director. Aleksandr Volkov established his film career in Russia, and was one of a significant number of film artists who fled Russia following the Bolshevik takeover.

The bulk of his output was in France where he was known as Alexandre Volkoff. He also made films in Germany and later Italy. He directed several films starring his fellow Russian exile Ivan Mozzhukhin.

Selected filmography

Director
Features unless otherwise specified:
 The Fugitive - a short film, Russia, France
 The Green Spider (1916) - a short film, Russia
 Father Sergius (1917) - co-director, Russia
 People Die for Metal (1919) - Russia
 The House of Mystery (1923) - France
 Les Ombres qui passent  (1924) - France
 Kean (1924) - France
 The Loves of Casanova (1927) - France
 Secrets of the Orient (1928) - France
 The White Devil (1930) - Germany
 Stjenka Rasin (1936) - Germany
  (1941) - Italy

Screenwriter
 Heart of an Actress (1924, dir. Germaine Dulac) - France

References

Bibliography
 Phillips, Alastair.  City of Darkness, City of Light: Émigré Filmmakers in Paris, 1929-1939. Amsterdam University Press, 2004.

External links

1885 births
1942 deaths
Russian refugees
Russian military personnel of World War I
Russian male film actors
Russian male silent film actors
Male screenwriters
Russian male writers
Russian film directors
Male actors from Moscow
People who emigrated to escape Bolshevism
Emigrants from the Russian Empire to France
Emigrants from the Russian Empire to Italy
20th-century Russian screenwriters
20th-century Russian male writers